RJ Praveen (born as Praveen Sethia) is an Indian radio jockey currently working at Red FM. He presents the Morning No.1 Show with RJ Praveen from 6 am to 12 pm. He is known for hosting the show Red Murga.

Early life
Praveen Sethia was born on 27 September 1985 Matri Mangal hospital in kolkata. Praveen's father is Mahendra sethia, a businessman. His mother is Chanda Sethia, a housewife.

He completed his graduation from the University of Calcutta.

Career
Praveen has started his career as a Customer Care Associate at Shopper’s Stop. He also worked in a call center as a voice quality analyst at Accenture Technology. In 2006 he joined Red FM as a Radio Jockey.

In Red FM he has hosted a show named Ek Kahani Aisi Bhi, which won the award of Best Narrated Show at the New York Radio Festival in 2015 and 2016.

Shows
 Desh Ka Naam
 Ek Kahani Aisi Bhi
U-turn
Umeedon Ka Repair
Red Murga

References

Living people
Indian radio presenters
 People from Bihar
 1986 births 
 University of Calcutta alumni